Biu, Nigeria, a town in Nigeria
 Biu Emirate, a traditional state
 Biu Plateau, the highland area
Bar-Ilan University, a university in Israel
Bermuda Industrial Union, a general trade union in Bermuda
Biu (footballer) (born 1936), Brazilian footballer
 Bus Interface Unit, a part of a processor that interfaces with a system bus
 BIU, the IATA airport code for Bíldudalur Airport in Iceland
 biu, the ISO 639 code of the Biate language of northeast India

See also 
 
 Biu–Mandara languages, a language group of Nigeria, Chad and Cameroon